Calogeros the Anchorite (or Calocerus,  and Caloriu, also known as Calogerus the Hermit and Calogerus of Sicily, Chalcedon c. 466 – 18 June, 561, Monte Kronio) was a hermetical monk, venerated as a saint by the Catholic and Orthodox churches, and the patron of many places in Sicily.

Veneration

Calogerus is commemorated by the Orthodox Church on June 18, together with the bishop Gregorius and the deacon Demetrius. The three saints are noted as opponents of Arianism who fled from Africa to Sicily to escape persecution. They were active in the area of Fragalata, near Messina. Calogerus is commemorated on the same day in the Catholic Church.
 
Saint Calogerus is venerated at Agrigento more than Saint Gerland, who is the patron of Agrigento. Other centres in which Saint Calogero is particularly venerated are Porto Empedocle, Naro, Sciacca, Frazzanó, San Salvatore di Fitalia, Cesaró, Petralia Sottana and  Campofranco. In iconography, he is usually identifiable as a bearded hermit with olive complexion wearing eastern (Syriac) hooded vestments.

See also

References

Sicilian saints
Saints of medieval Greece
5th-century Christian saints
5th-century Christian monks
6th-century Christian monks
Sciacca